Witchcraft is a 1964 British horror film directed by Don Sharp and starring Lon Chaney Jr., Jack Hedley and Jill Dixon. The script was written by Harry Spalding.

Plot
In the 17th century, in order to take over the Whitlock family's properties, the rival Lanier family accused Vanessa Whitlock (Yvette Rees) of witchcraft and had her buried alive. As a consequence, the Whitlocks still maintain a bitter hatred of the Laniers to the present day. However, two young descendants, Amy Whitlock (Diane Clare) and Todd Lanier (David Weston), fall in love with each other regardless of the objections of Amy's stern uncle, Morgan Whitlock (Lon Chaney Jr.).

Todd is a business associate of his older brother Bill Lanier (Jack Hedley). They are building developers who plan to transform and renovate the old Whitlock estate. Without their knowledge, their business partner Myles Forrester (Barry Linehan) instructs his workers to bulldoze over headstones and graves in the old Whitlock Cemetery, enraging Morgan Whitlock. From an exhumed grave emerges Vanessa Whitlock, still alive after three centuries. The Whitlocks still practice the old religion, and Morgan leads a coven that soon embraces Vanessa's return. Using her hex powers, they caused the mysterious deaths of Myles Forrester, as well as Bill and Todd's aunt, Helen (Viola Keats). Morgan is arrested as a suspect in the Forrester case, and the Laniers take Amy in while her uncle is in custody. More incidents nearly take the life of Bill, Todd and their grandmother Malvina (Marie Ney).

One night, Bill's wife Tracy (Jill Dixon) follows Amy into the Whitlock family crypt, which is located near the old Whitlock mansion, now residence of the Laniers. In a secret chamber deep inside the crypt, Tracy witnesses Amy, Morgan and the rest the coven perform magic rites which include sacrificing an infant. Tracy is captured and tied up, to be used as a human sacrifice. Looking for Tracy, Bill and Todd enter the Whitlock crypt, where they find and rescue her. Once Bill has taken Tracy back in the house, Todd goes back in the crypt to look for Amy, who was participating in the rituals with her family. When her uncle gets ready to kill Todd, Amy is pushed past her breaking point and tips over a giant brazier that sets Vanessa and the entire room on fire. Todd tries to reach Amy, but the entire crypt has turned into a raging inferno, which soon extends to the adjoining mansion. Screaming her name, he can only watch as the flames consume everything and everyone.

Later, a broken Todd joins his family outside and watches the Whitlock estate burn to the ground, ending the 300-year-old feud.

Cast
 Lon Chaney Jr. as Morgan Whitlock (as Lon Chaney)
 Jack Hedley as Bill Lanier
 Jill Dixon as Tracy Lanier
 Viola Keats as Helen Lanier
 Marie Ney as Malvina Lanier
 David Weston as Todd Lanier
 Diane Clare as Amy Whitlock
 Yvette Rees as Vanessa Whitlock
 Barry Linehan as Myles Forrester
 Victor Brooks as Inspector Baldwin
 Marianne Stone as Forrester's Secretary
 John Dunbar as Doctor
 Hilda Fenemore as Nurse (as Hilda Fennemore)

Production
Writer Harry Spalding says he got the idea to make a film from an incident that happened in San Francisco when an old cemetery was converted into a real estate development.

Don Sharp had received good notices for his direction of Kiss of the Vampire and was receiving lots of offers to do horror movies. He says Milton Subotsky wanted to work with Sharp and offered him a choice of three scripts to make but Sharp liked neither. He wound up making Witchcraft.

Sharp liked the script for Witchcraft, calling it "a damn good story" although he felt it suffered credibility problems being set in the present day.

According to one account the film was shot over 14 days, which was twice what Robert L. Lippert productions had back in the US. Sharp said in an interview it took twenty days. Filming took place in January 1964 at Shepperton Studios just after 110 technicians had been fired from the studio.

Spalding says that director Don Sharp "realized the thing very well" and burnt down an actual house for the climax.

Release
Witchcraft was released in the UK in March 1964 and in the U.S. the same year.

Don Sharp says the film received "marvelous notices" and claimed because the film was so cheap to make it made its cost back in "the first two weeks in California".

Home media
Witchcraft was released on Region 1 DVD, along with Devils of Darkness as part of the Midnite Movies range of classic and cult horror films, in 2007.

References

External links
 
 
 

1964 films
British black-and-white films
British supernatural horror films
Folk horror films
1964 horror films
Films directed by Don Sharp
Films about witchcraft
20th Century Fox films
Lippert Pictures films
1960s English-language films
1960s British films